Massachusetts House of Representatives' 12th Hampden district in the United States is one of 160 legislative districts included in the lower house of the Massachusetts General Court. It covers part of Hampden County. Since 2007, Angelo J. Puppolo, Jr. of the Democratic Party has represented the district.

Towns represented
The district includes the following localities:
 part of East Longmeadow
 part of Springfield
 Wilbraham

The current district geographic boundary overlaps with those of the Massachusetts Senate's 1st Hampden and Hampshire district and Hampden district.

Representatives

 Raymond A. Jordan
 Benjamin Swan
 Gale D. Candaras
 Angelo J. Puppolo, Jr., 2007-current

See also
 List of Massachusetts House of Representatives elections
 List of Massachusetts General Courts
 List of former districts of the Massachusetts House of Representatives

Images
Portraits of legislators

References

External links
 Ballotpedia
  (State House district information based on U.S. Census Bureau's American Community Survey).

House
Government of Hampden County, Massachusetts